The Arrondissement of Rouen is an arrondissement of France in the Seine-Maritime department in the Normandy region. It has 216 communes.

Composition

The communes of the arrondissement of Rouen, and their INSEE codes, are:

 Allouville-Bellefosse (76001)
 Amfreville-la-Mi-Voie (76005)
 Amfreville-les-Champs (76006)
 Anceaumeville (76007)
 Ancretiéville-Saint-Victor (76010)
 Anneville-Ambourville (76020)
 Anquetierville (76022)
 Anvéville (76023)
 Arelaune-en-Seine (76401)
 Authieux-Ratiéville (76038)
 Les Authieux-sur-le-Port-Saint-Ouen (76039)
 Auzebosc (76043)
 Auzouville-l'Esneval (76045)
 Auzouville-sur-Ry (76046)
 Baons-le-Comte (76055)
 Bardouville (76056)
 Barentin (76057)
 Beaumont-le-Hareng (76062)
 Belbeuf (76069)
 Bénesville (76077)
 Berville-en-Caux (76087)
 Berville-sur-Seine (76088)
 Bierville (76094)
 Bihorel (76095)
 Blacqueville (76099)
 Blainville-Crevon (76100)
 Le Bocasse (76105)
 Bois-d'Ennebourg (76106)
 Bois-Guilbert (76107)
 Bois-Guillaume (76108)
 Bois-Héroult (76109)
 Bois-Himont (76110)
 Bois-l'Évêque (76111)
 Boissay (76113)
 Bonsecours (76103)
 Boos (76116)
 Bosc-Bordel (76120)
 Bosc-Édeline (76121)
 Bosc-Guérard-Saint-Adrien (76123)
 Bosc-le-Hard (76125)
 Boudeville (76129)
 La Bouille (76131)
 Bourdainville (76132)
 Bouville (76135)
 Bretteville-Saint-Laurent (76144)
 Buchy (76146)
 Butot (76149)
 Cailly (76152)
 Canteleu (76157)
 Canville-les-Deux-Églises (76158)
 Carville-la-Folletière (76160)
 Carville-Pot-de-Fer (76161)
 Catenay (76163)
 Caudebec-lès-Elbeuf (76165)
 Cideville (76174)
 Claville-Motteville (76177)
 Cléon (76178)
 Clères (76179)
 Cottévrard (76188)
 Criquetot-sur-Ouville (76198)
 Croix-Mare (76203)
 Darnétal (76212)
 Déville-lès-Rouen (76216)
 Doudeville (76219)
 Duclair (76222)
 Écalles-Alix (76223)
 Écretteville-lès-Baons (76225)
 Ectot-l'Auber (76227)
 Ectot-lès-Baons (76228)
 Elbeuf (76231)
 Elbeuf-sur-Andelle (76230)
 Émanville (76234)
 Épinay-sur-Duclair (76237)
 Ernemont-sur-Buchy (76243)
 Eslettes (76245)
 Esteville (76247)
 Étalleville (76251)
 Étoutteville (76253)
 Flamanville (76264)
 Fontaine-le-Bourg (76271)
 Fontaine-sous-Préaux (76273)
 Franqueville-Saint-Pierre (76475)
 Freneuse (76282)
 Fresne-le-Plan (76285)
 Fresquiennes (76287)
 Frichemesnil (76290)
 Fultot (76293)
 Gonzeville (76309)
 Goupillières (76311)
 Gouy (76313)
 Grainville-sur-Ry (76316)
 Grand-Couronne (76319)
 Le Grand-Quevilly (76322)
 Grémonville (76325)
 Grigneuseville (76328)
 Grugny (76331)
 Harcanville (76340)
 Hautot-le-Vatois (76347)
 Hautot-Saint-Sulpice (76348)
 Hautot-sur-Seine (76350)
 Les Hauts-de-Caux (76041)
 Hénouville (76354)
 Héricourt-en-Caux (76355)
 Héronchelles (76359)
 Heurteauville (76362)
 Le Houlme (76366)
 Houppeville (76367)
 La Houssaye-Béranger (76369)
 Hugleville-en-Caux (76370)
 Isneauville (76377)
 Jumièges (76378)
 Limésy (76385)
 Lindebeuf (76387)
 La Londe (76391)
 Longuerue (76396)
 Louvetot (76398)
 Malaunay (76402)
 Maromme (76410)
 Martainville-Épreville (76412)
 Maulévrier-Sainte-Gertrude (76418)
 Mauny (76419)
 Le Mesnil-Esnard (76429)
 Mesnil-Panneville (76433)
 Mesnil-Raoul (76434)
 Le Mesnil-sous-Jumièges (76436)
 Mont-Cauvaire (76443)
 Mont-Saint-Aignan (76451)
 Montigny (76446)
 Montmain (76448)
 Montville (76452)
 Morgny-la-Pommeraye (76453)
 Motteville (76456)
 Moulineaux (76457)
 La Neuville-Chant-d'Oisel (76464)
 Notre-Dame-de-Bliquetuit (76473)
 Notre-Dame-de-Bondeville (76474)
 Oissel (76484)
 Orival (76486)
 Ouville-l'Abbaye (76491)
 Pavilly (76495)
 Petit-Couronne (76497)
 Le Petit-Quevilly (76498)
 Pierreval (76502)
 Pissy-Pôville (76503)
 Préaux (76509)
 Prétot-Vicquemare (76510)
 Quevillon (76513)
 Quévreville-la-Poterie (76514)
 Quincampoix (76517)
 Rebets (76521)
 Reuville (76524)
 Rives-en-Seine (76164)
 Robertot (76530)
 Rocquefort (76531)
 Roncherolles-sur-le-Vivier (76536)
 Rouen (76540)
 Roumare (76541)
 Routes (76542)
 La Rue-Saint-Pierre (76547)
 Ry (76548)
 Sahurs (76550)
 Saint-Aignan-sur-Ry (76554)
 Saint-André-sur-Cailly (76555)
 Saint-Arnoult (76557)
 Saint-Aubin-Celloville (76558)
 Saint-Aubin-de-Crétot (76559)
 Saint-Aubin-Épinay (76560)
 Saint-Aubin-lès-Elbeuf (76561)
 Saint-Clair-sur-les-Monts (76568)
 Saint-Denis-le-Thiboult (76573)
 Sainte-Austreberthe (76566)
 Sainte-Croix-sur-Buchy (76571)
 Sainte-Marguerite-sur-Duclair (76608)
 Sainte-Marie-des-Champs (76610)
 Saint-Étienne-du-Rouvray (76575)
 Saint-Georges-sur-Fontaine (76580)
 Saint-Germain-des-Essourts (76581)
 Saint-Germain-sous-Cailly (76583)
 Saint-Gilles-de-Crétot (76585)
 Saint-Jacques-sur-Darnétal (76591)
 Saint-Jean-du-Cardonnay (76594)
 Saint-Laurent-en-Caux (76597)
 Saint-Léger-du-Bourg-Denis (76599)
 Saint-Martin-aux-Arbres (76611)
 Saint-Martin-de-Boscherville (76614)
 Saint-Martin-de-l'If (76289)
 Saint-Martin-du-Vivier (76617)
 Saint-Nicolas-de-la-Haie (76626)
 Saint-Paër (76631)
 Saint-Pierre-de-Manneville (76634)
 Saint-Pierre-de-Varengeville (76636)
 Saint-Pierre-lès-Elbeuf (76640)
 Saussay (76668)
 Servaville-Salmonville (76673)
 Sierville (76675)
 Sotteville-lès-Rouen (76681)
 Sotteville-sous-le-Val (76682)
 Le Torp-Mesnil (76699)
 Touffreville-la-Corbeline (76702)
 Tourville-la-Rivière (76705)
 Le Trait (76709)
 Val-de-la-Haye (76717)
 Valliquerville (76718)
 Vatteville-la-Rue (76727)
 La Vaupalière (76728)
 Vibeuf (76737)
 Vieux-Manoir (76738)
 La Vieux-Rue (76740)
 Villers-Écalles (76743)
 Yainville (76750)
 Yerville (76752)
 Ymare (76753)
 Yquebeuf (76756)
 Yvecrique (76757)
 Yvetot (76758)
 Yville-sur-Seine (76759)

History

The arrondissement of Rouen was created in 1800. At the January 2017 reorganisation of the arrondissements of Seine-Maritime, it received four communes from the arrondissement of Dieppe and seven communes from the arrondissement of Le Havre, and it lost four communes to the arrondissement of Dieppe.

As a result of the reorganisation of the cantons of France which came into effect in 2015, the borders of the cantons are no longer related to the borders of the arrondissements. The cantons of the arrondissement of Rouen were, as of January 2015:

 Bois-Guillaume
 Boos
 Buchy
 Caudebec-en-Caux
 Caudebec-lès-Elbeuf
 Clères
 Darnétal
 Doudeville
 Duclair
 Elbeuf
 Grand-Couronne
 Le Grand-Quevilly
 Maromme
 Mont-Saint-Aignan
 Notre-Dame-de-Bondeville
 Pavilly
 Le Petit-Quevilly
 Rouen-1
 Rouen-2
 Rouen-3
 Rouen-4
 Rouen-5
 Rouen-6
 Rouen-7
 Saint-Étienne-du-Rouvray
 Sotteville-lès-Rouen-Est
 Sotteville-lès-Rouen-Ouest
 Yerville
 Yvetot

References

Rouen